"Big Guitar" is a song written by Henry Gross and Henry Paul, and recorded by American country music band  Blackhawk.  It was released in June 1996 as the fourth single from their album Strong Enough.  It peaked at number 17 on the United States Billboard Hot Country Singles & Tracks chart while it was a top ten in Canada, peaking at number 8 there.

Music video
The music video was directed by Jim Shea/Michael Salomon and premiered in mid-1996.

Chart performance
"Big Guitar" debuted at number 62 on the U.S. Billboard Hot Country Singles & Tracks for the week of June 15, 1996.

Year-end charts

References

1995 songs
Blackhawk (band) songs
1996 singles
Arista Nashville singles
Song recordings produced by Mark Bright (record producer)
Songs written by Henry Paul (musician)
Songs written by Henry Gross